The Exodus refers to was a massive flight of Belgian, Dutch, Luxembourgish, and French populations in May – June 1940 when the German army invaded Belgium, the Netherlands, and the majority of French territory during the Battle of France, after the breakthrough at Sedan. This exodus is one of the largest refugee crisis in the French history, and also one of thee largest population movements of the 20th century in Western Europe.

During the summer of 1940 and in the following months, the French had to deal with millions of civilian refugees fleeing the war. Automobiles and horse-drawn carts carrying possessions clogged roads. As the government had not foreseen such a rapid military collapse, there were few plans to cope. Between six and ten million French fled, sometimes so quickly that they left uneaten meals on tables, even while officials stated that there was no need to panic and that civilians should stay. The population of Chartres dropped from 23,000 to 800 and Lille from 200,000 to 20,000, while cities in the south such as Pau and Bordeaux rapidly grew in population.

See also
World War II evacuation and expulsion

References

Further reading 

 

Battle of France
World War II refugees
Refugees in France
May 1940 events
June 1940 events